Vera Zvonareva won the first edition of this tournament, defeating Ksenia Pervak in the final, 6–1, 6–4.

Seeds

Qualifying

Draw

Finals

Top half

Bottom half

References
Main Draw

Baku Cup - Singles
2011 Singles